Elizabeth Curtis Sittenfeld (born 1975) is an American writer. She is the author of a collection of short stories, You Think it, I’ll Say It (2018), as well as six novels: Prep (2005), the story of students at a Massachusetts prep school; The Man of My Dreams (2006), a coming-of-age novel and an examination of romantic love; American Wife (2008), a fictional story loosely based on the life of First Lady Laura Bush; Sisterland (2013), which tells the story of identical twins with psychic powers, Eligible (2016), a modern-day retelling of Pride and Prejudice, and Rodham (2020), an alternate history political novel about the life of Hillary Clinton.

Life and education
Elizabeth Curtis Sittenfeld was born August 23, 1975, in Cincinnati, Ohio. She is the second of four children (three girls and a boy) born to Elizabeth "Betsy" Curtis (née Bascom) and Paul George Sittenfeld (d. 2021). Her mother is an art history teacher and librarian at Seven Hills School, a private school in Cincinnati, and her father was an investment adviser. Her younger brother, P.G. Sittenfeld, is a former member of the Cincinnati City Council. Her mother is Catholic and her father was Jewish.

She attended Seven Hills School through the eighth grade, then attended high school at Groton School, a boarding school in Groton, Massachusetts, graduating in 1993. In 1992, the summer before her senior year, she won Seventeen magazine's fiction contest.

She attended Vassar College in Poughkeepsie, New York before transferring to Stanford University in Palo Alto, California. At Stanford, she studied creative writing, wrote articles for the college newspaper, and edited that paper's weekly arts magazine. At the time, she was also chosen as one of Glamourʼs College Women of the Year. She went on to earn an MFA from the Iowa Writers' Workshop at the University of Iowa.

In 2008, she married Matt Carlson. They have two daughters.

Career

Prep
Her first novel, Prep, which took her three years to write, was published in 2005 and concerns a girl, Lee Fiora, from South Bend, Indiana, who goes to Ault School, an elite boarding school near Boston, Massachusetts.

Elissa Schappell, who wrote in The New York Times Review of Books: "Sittenfeld's dialogue is so convincing that one wonders if she didn't wear a wire under her hockey kilt." The New York Times named Prep one of their top five works of fiction for 2005.<ref>The Ten Best Books of 2005," The New York Times Book Review, December 11, 2005.</ref> Entertainment Weekly labelled Prep a "cult-classic" in a 2018 reassessment.

The Man of My Dreams
Sittenfeld's second novel, called The Man of My Dreams, was published in May 2006 by Random House. It follows a girl named Hannah from the end of her eighth grade year through her college years at Tufts University and into her late twenties.

American Wife
Sittenfeld's third novel, called American Wife (2008), is the tale of Alice Blackwell, a fictional character who shares many similarities with former First Lady Laura Bush. In November 2011, it was announced that Red Crown Productions had begun work on a film version, with the adaptation written by Academy Award-nominated screenwriter Ron Nyswaner.

SisterlandSisterland was published on June 25, 2013. The book's protagonist Kate is an identical twin with psychic powers.

EligibleEligible was published on April 19, 2016, by Random House. It is a woke retelling of Pride and Prejudice set in Cincinnati, Ohio. In September 2017, ABC announced its commitment to make a TV pilot of Eligible with Sherri Cooper and Jennifer Levin to write it.

You Think It, I'll Say ItYou Think It, I'll Say It is a collection of short stories that Random House published on April 24, 2018.

RodhamRodham is an alternate history political novel about the life of Hillary Clinton, published in 2020. The novel diverges from reality at the point where Hillary chooses not to marry Bill Clinton and enters political life as a single woman. Rodham divided critics.

Romantic Comedy
A new novel, Romantic Comedy'', is scheduled to be published in April 2023.

References

External links

Official website

1975 births
21st-century American novelists
American women novelists
American chick lit writers
Groton School alumni
Living people
Writers from Cincinnati
Iowa Writers' Workshop alumni
Pseudonymous women writers
Seven Hills School (Cincinnati, Ohio) alumni
Vassar College alumni
21st-century American women writers
Stanford University alumni
American women short story writers
21st-century American short story writers
Novelists from Ohio
Novels
21st-century pseudonymous writers